Banksia corvijuga is a species of densely-foliaged shrub that is endemic to Western Australia. It has broadly linear, serrated leaves, heads of about sixty yellow flowers and glabrous follicles.

Description
Banksia corvijuga is a densely-foliaged shrub that typically grows to a height of  but does not form a lignotuber.

Taxonomy and naming
This banksia was first formally described in 1996 by Alex George in the journal Nuytsia and given the name Dryandra corvijuga from specimens collected in 1986 near  Ravensthorpe. In 2007, Austin Mast and Kevin Thiele transferred all the dryandras to the genus Banksia and this species became Banksia corvijuga. The specific epithet (corvijuga) is derived from Latin words meaning "a crow or raven" and "paired or yoked together", referring to the Ravensthorpe Range.

Distribution and habitat
Banksia corvijuga grows in dense shrubland in the Ravensthorpe Range.

Conservation status
This banksia is classified as "Priority Three" by the Government of Western Australia Department of Parks and Wildlife meaning that it is poorly known and known from only a few locations but is not under imminent threat.

References

corvijuga
Plants described in 1996
Endemic flora of Western Australia
Eudicots of Western Australia
Taxa named by Kevin Thiele